Yoo Chang-hyun (born May 14, 1985) is a South Korea football player who plays for Seongnam FC.

Club career statistics

References

1985 births
Living people
South Korean footballers
Association football forwards
Pohang Steelers players
Gimcheon Sangmu FC players
Jeonbuk Hyundai Motors players
Seongnam FC players
Seoul E-Land FC players
K League 1 players
K League 2 players
Sportspeople from Gyeonggi Province